Channel 4 News is the main news programme on British television broadcaster Channel 4. It is produced by ITN, and has been in operation since Channel 4's launch in November 1982.

Current productions

Channel 4 News
Channel 4 News is the name of Channel 4's award-winning flagship evening news programme.

The editor is Esme Wren, appointed in 2022.
The programme is presented by  Krishnan Guru-Murthy, Cathy Newman, Matt Frei, Jackie Long and Fatima Manji and is on the air Monday to Thursday from 7:00 to 7:55 pm, Friday from 7:00 to 7:30 pm, and at variable times at weekends. Alex Thomson is the chief correspondent.

Channel 4 News is among the highest-rated television programmes in the United Kingdom, winning a record five Royal Television Society Television Awards in February 2006. These included TV Journalist of the Year for Jon Snow, Home News Award for the Attorney-General leak, and the International News Award for Congo's Tin Soldiers.

It won the News Coverage British Academy Television Award in 2004 and the 2004 International Emmy for the best news programme produced and aired outside the United States. Jon Snow won the Richard Dimbleby British Academy Television Award in 2005 for outstanding contribution to the world of news and current affairs.

In November 2011, Liam Dutton became Channel 4's first ever weather presenter, joining from BBC Weather. The exposé of Cambridge Analytica in conjunction with The Guardian and The New York Times which aired in 2018 was awarded a Peabody Award.

In April 2021, Channel 4 and ITN announced that Snow would leave the programme after 32 years. His last show was on 23 December 2021.

Channel 4 News Summary
A replacement for the Channel 4 News at Noon in the 12.00 pm slot, it first aired on 21 December 2009, giving a five-minute summary of the news.

Former productions

Channel Four News at Noon
Channel Four News at Noon was first introduced in 2003 for the duration of the Iraq War, and due to its instant success, it was kept on in Channel 4's daytime schedule (except when live Horse Racing was being broadcast). It was presented by Krishnan Guru-Murthy. Prior to this bulletin, the programme in the slot was Powerhouse, a political news programme, also produced for Channel 4 by ITN. As a consequence of the advertising slowdown during the 2009 recession, the programme was cancelled, along with More4 News and replaced with the five minute Channel 4 News Summary, the last broadcast airing on 18 December 2009.

More4 News

Aired Monday to Friday on sister channel More4, More4 News was anchored by Sarah Smith then later Kylie Morris, it ran for 30 minutes, aiming to go in-depth into a certain issue. As a consequence of the advertising slowdown during the 2009 recession, the programme was cancelled, along with the Channel Four News at Noon, the last broadcast airing on 18 December 2009.

On-air team

Current newscasters

Krishnan Guru-Murthy (1998–present, Lead presenter 2022–present)
Matt Frei (2011–present)
Cathy Newman (2011–present)
Jackie Long (2015–present)
Fatima Manji (2016–present)

Former newscasters

Godfrey Hodgson (1982–85)
Sarah Hogg (1982–85)
Trevor McDonald (1982–89)
Gavin Scott (1982–86)
Peter Sissons (Lead presenter 1982–89)
John Suchet (1982–1988)
Sandy Gall (1983–84)
Alastair Stewart (1983–87)
Sue Turton (1983–2010)
Carol Barnes (1984–92)
Sonia Ruseler (1984–92)
Nicholas Owen (1985–91)
Norman Rees (1985–87)
Brenda Rowe (1985–87)
Tristana Moore (1986–99)
Sue Carpenter (1988–90)
Zeinab Badawi (1989–98)
Jon Snow  (Lead presenter 1989–2021)
Fiona Armstrong (1990–91)
Fiona Murch (1991–94)
Shahnaz Pakravan (1991–95)
Dermot Murnaghan (1992–95)
Sarah Spiller (1992–93)
Alex Thomson (1999–2004)
Samira Ahmed (2000–11)
Katie Razzall (2005–2015)
Sheena McDonald

Correspondents/editors

General
Alex Thomson (Chief Correspondent)
Paraic O'Brien (Correspondent)
Fatima Manji (Reporter)
Symeon Brown (News Correspondent)
Ayshah Tull (News Correspondent)
Minnie Stephenson (News Correspondent)
Paul McNamara (Reporter)
Anja Popp (Reporter)
Kiran Moodley (Reporter)

Political
Gary Gibbon (Political Editor)

Home Affairs
Andy Davies (Home Affairs Correspondent)
Darshna Soni (Home Affairs Correspondent)

Regional 
Clare Fallon (North of England Correspondent)
Ciaran Jenkins (Scotland Correspondent)

International
Lindsey Hilsum (International Editor)
Siobhan Kennedy (Washington Correspondent)
Jonathan Miller (Foreign Affairs Correspondent)
Jonathan Rugman (Foreign Affairs Correspondent)
Jamal Osman (Africa Correspondent)
Guillermo Galdos (Latin America Correspondent)

Health 
Victoria Macdonald (Health & Social Care Editor)
Ruben Reuter (Disability Correspondent)

Economics
Helia Ebrahimi (Economics Correspondent)

Sports
Keme Nzerem (Sports Correspondent)
Jordan Jarrett-Bryan (Sports Reporter)

Source:

Weather forecaster

Design team

Non-broadcast media
Channel 4 News also produces a variety of non-broadcast media, including a range of journalist authored blogs to deliver insight and analysis of the news from the news team. Channel 4 News also produces Snowmail, a free daily email from the news reporter team, giving their personal take on the day's news agenda and behind-the-scenes newsroom goings-on.

Historical roles
In 2003, Channel 4 News broke the story of the Dodgy Dossier which led to a political crisis in Britain.

The story of the Conservative Party's election expenses scandal was first broken, and then pursued for over a year, by Michael Crick.

In March 2018, an undercover investigation by Channel 4 News explored the campaign activities of Cambridge Analytica.

2017 Westminster attack report
On the evening of the Westminster attack of 22 March 2017, Channel 4 News claimed they were able to name the dead attacker as Abu Izzadeen, also known as Trevor Brooks. The claim was repeated by The Independent and the Daily Mirror. However, Channel 4 News was forced to issue an on-air retraction during the same bulletin after Izzadeen's solicitor stated that he was alive and serving time in prison.

Theme music
The music in the Channel 4 News titles is an orchestration of "Best Endeavours" by Alan Hawkshaw. It was introduced a few months after the channel's launch, and has remained in use since its inception.

References

External links

Watch Channel 4 News online
ITN.co.uk

1982 British television series debuts
1990s British television series
2000s British television series
2010s British television series
2020s British television series
British television news shows
Channel 4
Channel 4 original programming
International Emmy Awards Current Affairs & News winners
ITN